Jack 'Copper' Evans (19 January 1908 – 10 July 1960) was an Australian rules footballer who played with Geelong in the Victorian Football League (VFL) during the 1930s.

Although primarily a ruckman, Evans could also play at centre half-forward and was Geelong's top goalkicker in 1935 with 32 goals. He played in two premiership sides, the first in 1931, and the second in 1937 when he kicked six goals in the Grand Final against Collingwood. Evans was a regular Victorian interstate representative, playing a total of nine games for his state. A policeman from 1932-1960, Evans was inducted into the Victoria Police Sporting Hall Of Fame on 13 September 2011.

References

1908 births
Australian rules footballers from Geelong
Geelong Football Club players
Geelong Football Club Premiership players
Minyip Football Club players
1960 deaths
Two-time VFL/AFL Premiership players